The 2017 Florida Gators football team represented the University of Florida in the 2017 NCAA Division I FBS football season. The Gators played their home games at Ben Hill Griffin Stadium in Gainesville, Florida. Florida played as a member of the Eastern Division of the Southeastern Conference (SEC). They were led by third-year head coach Jim McElwain until his dismissal on October 28, after which defensive coordinator Randy Shannon served as the interim head coach until the end of the season.

Florida finished with a 4–7 record overall and were 3–5 in SEC play, good for fifth place in the Eastern Division. It was the program's second losing season since 1979.

Previous season

The 2016 season opener was highlighted by the rededication of Florida Field to honor Steve Spurrier, the all-time winningest head coach in Florida history, as the field was rebranded as Steve Spurrier-Florida Field.  Florida yielded only 14 points over the first three games of the 2016 season, including a 38-point domination of SEC East rival Kentucky, and a shutout victory over the North Texas Mean Green.  In the latter game, Gators starting quarterback Luke Del Rio exited the game with a knee injury and would not return. Austin Appleby was called to lead the offense for the next two games at Tennessee and Vanderbilt respectively.  Tennessee, seeking revenge for the previous year's comeback by the Gators at The Swamp, quickly fell behind as the Gators entered halftime with a commanding 21–3 lead.  However, the Gators experienced a colossal collapse in the second half as Tennessee stormed back with 35 unanswered points before Florida could score a touchdown late in the game, and the Gators left Knoxville with a stunning 28–38 loss on their record, the first of the season.  At Vanderbilt, the Gators struggled to a 13–6 victory over the Commodores.  The Gators' next game was to be against the LSU in Gainesville.  However, it became apparent that week as the date of the game approached that Hurricane Matthew would likely devastate Florida's Atlantic coast.  Because only a small deviation in the storm's destructive projected path would have brought severe weather to the immediate Gainesville area, the Saturday game was indefinitely postponed on Thursday.  In the week that followed, heated negotiations between athletic directors Jeremy Foley of Florida and Joe Alleva of LSU.  LSU refused to concede a home game in order to make up the game, so Florida agreed to travel to LSU on November 19.  In exchange, LSU agreed to play the Florida game in Gainesville for the next two seasons.  After an unplanned bye week, Florida cruised to a 40–14 victory over Missouri, a game in which Luke Del Rio made his return, as the Gators led into the originally scheduled bye week before the annual rivalry game against Georgia in Jacksonville.  Florida led 14–10 after a back-and-forth first half before shutting out the Bulldogs 10–0 in the second half to earn their third consecutive victory over their rivals with a 24–10 win, earning a 6–1 record on the season. With Tennessee losing their third consecutive conference game the same day, Florida moved into November with a 2-game advantage over the Volunteers.  However, the Gators would pick up their second conference loss the following week after a 31–10 blowout by the unranked Arkansas Razorbacks.  Florida returned home for senior day against South Carolina the next week, defeating the Gamecocks 20–7 in Will Muschamp's first time back to The Swamp since his firing after the 2014 season.  The Gators were now poised to secure the Eastern Division championship in the conference finale, the makeup game at LSU.  The defense capitalized on numerous LSU turnovers while the offense put on a solid performance which included a 98-yard touchdown pass to put the Gators up 10–7 entering the fourth quarter.  The game eventually came down to a fourth-and-goal play for LSU with three seconds remaining in the game, a play which was stuffed by the Gators defense, preserving an emotional 16–10 win in Death Valley to guarantee a berth in the 2016 SEC Championship Game against undefeated Alabama.  Florida lost for the fourth straight year to rival Florida State 13–31 to close out the regular season, and was trounced 54–16 by Alabama in the SEC Championship Game.  Florida accepted a berth in the 2017 Outback Bowl against Iowa, which the Gators easily won 30–3 to end the season at 9–4, earning Jim McElwain his only bowl victory at Florida.

Spring Game
The spring game, dubbed the Orange and Blue Debut, took place on April 7, in Gainesville.

Schedule
The Gators' 2017 schedule consisted of 6 home games, 3 away games, and 2 neutral site games in the regular season. The Gators hosted SEC opponents Tennessee, Vanderbilt, LSU, and Texas A&M. They traveled to Kentucky, Missouri, and South Carolina. They faced Georgia at a neutral site.

Florida's non-conference schedule consisted of two home games: UAB and their rival Florida State. A third was scheduled for Sep 9 vs Northern Colorado, but was canceled due to inclement weather caused by Hurricane Irma. The season was opened against Michigan in the Advocare Classic.

The game between Florida and Northern Colorado was originally scheduled for September 9 at 7:30 p.m. On the Wednesday before the game, the kickoff time was moved up to noon, as forecasts for Hurricane Irma had the storm approaching the east coast of Florida on Sunday. On Thursday, updated forecast tracks (correctly) predicted that Irma would move up the middle of the Florida peninsula as a major hurricane, prompting both schools to agree to cancel the game altogether due to safety and traffic concerns. This cancellation marked the third time in four seasons that Florida had to cancel or move a home game due to inclement weather and the second season in a row in which a scheduled home game was affected by the threat of a hurricane.

Schedule Source

Rankings

Game summaries

No.11 Michigan

Special "color rush" uniforms

No.23 Tennessee

With 0:09 seconds left in the fourth quarter quarterback Feleipe Franks threw a 63 yard hail mary to wide receiver Tyrie Cleveland for the win.

Kentucky

Vanderbilt

LSU

Texas A&M

Special "alligator skin" uniforms

No.3 Georgia

Following the game, it was announced that Florida and Head Coach Jim McElwain would be parting ways and Defensive coordinator Randy Shannon was to be promoted to interim head coach for the remainder of the season.

Missouri

South Carolina

UAB

Florida State

Personnel

Roster

  Redshirt
  Injury
 SUS Suspension

Coaching staff

Recruiting class

Players drafted into the NFL

References

Florida
Florida Gators football seasons
Florida Gators football